Maharashtra State Highway 253 (MH SH 253) is a normal state highway in Nagpur, in the state of Maharashtra.  This state highway touches Mauda, Nagardan, Ramtek,  connecting  with NH-6 at  Mauda.

Summary 

This road is  one of the important roads in Nagpur District providing connectivity with  two National Highways, NH-6 and NH-7 just 5 km from Ramtek through MH SH 249.

Major junctions 

 This highway started from the intersection at Mauda town with NH-7 and end at Ramtek city connecting with MH SH 249.  MH SH 266 is also connecting with this highway near Tarsa village.

Connections 
Many villages, cities and towns in Nagpur District are connecting by this state highway.
Mauda
Tarsa
Nagardan
Ramtek

Few other important landmark on this highway.
NTPC Mauda Super Thermal Power Station
Kavikulguru Institute of Technology & Science, Ramtek.
Kavi Kulguru Kalidas Sanskrit University, Ramtek.
Parmatma Ek Sevak Manavdharm Aashram.
Surya Laxmi Cotton Mill.
Hindalco Industry Ltd, Mauda.
DCL Polyester Plant(RIL)

See also 
 List of State Highways in Maharashtra

References 

State Highways in Maharashtra
State Highways in Nagpur District